Sisimiut Hydro Power Plant is a hydroelectric power plant near Sisimiut, Greenland. Construction started in March 2007 and the plant was commissioned on 7 April 2010. The initial capacity of the power plant is 15 MW.

References

External links

 Hydro Power Plant Sisimiut Greenland

Hydroelectric power stations in Greenland
Sisimiut
Energy infrastructure completed in 2010
2010 establishments in Greenland